Connection is the second studio album from South Korean boy band Up10tion. The album was released on June 14, 2021. The album consists of ten songs, with "Spin Off" serving as the lead single.

Background 
Connection is Up10tion's first album in over three years following the release of Invitation on March 15, 2018.

Members Sunyoul and Hwanhee have previously participated in episode 7 of MBC's Voice King.

Release and commercial performance 
On May 20, 2021, a comeback spoiler image was released by TOP Media through the group's official social accounts.

The group held their showcase in the afternoon on the same day as their comeback. 

The album debuted in number 3 on South Korean Gaon Charts which was followed by 12 in Japan Digital Charts respectively.

Songs 
Kuhn and Bitto co-wrote eight of out of the ten tracks. Kogyeol wrote and composed for the song, "Sky Line". Xiao also wrote and composed the songs, "Destroyed" and "Honey Cake".

Track listing

Charts

References 

2021 albums
Korean-language albums
Up10tion albums